Sclerograptis is a genus of moth in the family Gelechiidae. It contains the species Sclerograptis oxytypa, which is found in Guyana.

References

Gelechiinae